Aqib Javed (born 5 February 1997) is a Pakistani cricketer. He made his first-class debut for Bahawalpur Stags in the 2014–15 Quaid-e-Azam Trophy on 23 November 2014. He made his List A debut for Zarai Taraqiati Bank Limited in the 2018–19 Quaid-e-Azam One Day Cup on 13 September 2018.

References

External links
 

1997 births
Living people
Pakistani cricketers
Zarai Taraqiati Bank Limited cricketers
Place of birth missing (living people)